Semion Grossu (born 18 March 1934) is a Moldovan politician and businessman.

Biography 
Grossu was born on 18 March 1934 in the commune of Satu-Nou, Cetatea Albă County, Kingdom of Romania (nowadays Bilhorod-Dnistrovskyi Raion, Ukraine). In 1961, he joined the Communist Party of Moldavia.

Grossu was the prime minister of the Moldavian Soviet Socialist Republic (1 August 1976 – 30 December 1980) and the Minister of Foreign Affairs of the Moldovan SSR (1 September 1976 – 31 December 1980). He later became First Secretary of the Communist Party of Moldavia (30 December 1981 – 16 November 1989). He was the final Moldavian SSR leader to espouse the Soviet party line; his successor, Petru Lucinschi, was identified with aspirations for Moldovan independence, which was finally achieved in 1991.

Since 1991, Semion Grossu has been the chairman of the Russo–Moldovan winemaking firm, Product Impex SRL. In a video posted on YouTube in 2009, filmed by the Moldovan news source Internet TV, Grossu said he did not consider himself a public figure.

References 
 
 *** – Enciclopedia sovietică moldovenească (Chişinău, 1970–1977)

External links
 Гроссу Семен Кузьмич

 

 

1934 births
Living people
People from Odesa Oblast
Central Committee of the Communist Party of the Soviet Union members
Seventh convocation members of the Soviet of the Union
Ninth convocation members of the Soviet of the Union
Tenth convocation members of the Soviet of the Union
Eleventh convocation members of the Soviet of the Union
Members of the Congress of People's Deputies of the Soviet Union
First Secretaries of the Communist Party of Moldavia
Heads of government of the Moldavian Soviet Socialist Republic
People's commissars and ministers of the Moldavian Soviet Socialist Republic
Members of the Supreme Soviet of the Moldavian Soviet Socialist Republic
Recipients of the Order of Friendship of Peoples
Recipients of the Order of Lenin
Recipients of the Order of the Red Banner of Labour
Moldovan economists
Moldovan businesspeople